Nick Browder (born April 8, 1975) is a former Arena football quarterback who played in the Arena Football League for the Buffalo Destroyers (2000), the Grand Rapids Rampage (2001, 2003, 2005), the Detroit Fury (2002), and the Philadelphia Soul (2004) and the New York Dragons. In 2007, he signed with the Dallas Desperados as the backup to Clint Dolezel. He played college football at Valparaiso University. He is a member of the Valparaiso University Athletic Hall of Fame.

In 2006, he was signed by the New York Dragons after star quarterback Aaron Garcia went down for the season with an injury. When backup to Garcia, Juston Wood, also was injured for the season, Browder was brought into the game on March 12 against the Austin Wranglers. Browder led the team to a 10-6 record, 8-2 with Browder and a playoff berth, but they fell to the Georgia Force in the opening round.

Browder is the current head coach of the Waukegan High School Football Team

External links
Valpo Athletics Hall of Fame
Nick Browder on ArenaFan.com

1975 births
Living people
American football quarterbacks
Buffalo Destroyers players
Dallas Desperados players
Detroit Fury players
Grand Rapids Rampage players
New York Dragons players
Philadelphia Soul players
Players of American football from Illinois
Sportspeople from Waukegan, Illinois
Valparaiso Beacons football players